Turlough, (: in particular, a seasonal lake) is a village in County Mayo, Ireland, 6 km northeast of Castlebar. It is known for the presence of the Museum of Country Life (part of the National Museum of Ireland), and for its well-preserved and unusually squat round tower, built between 900 and 1200.

Turlough is also the name of the surrounding 241-acre townland. It lies along the Castlebar River just off the N5 road, and the countryside around the village is scattered with standing stones, a holy well, fulachtaí fia, and cillíní.

FitzGerald family 
In the eighteenth century it was the home of a branch of the FitzGerald family, distant cousins to the Earl of Desmond. The most celebrated member of the family was the notably eccentric George Robert FitzGerald, nicknamed "Fighting FitzGerald". Having spent most of his short life gambling and duelling, he was hanged for conspiracy to murder his father's attorney in 1786.

Facilities
Turlough's facilities include a pub ('The Turlough Inn'), a shop, a hair salon, and a lifestyle and garden centre with a restaurant a short distance away. Turlough is also home to a branch of the National Museum of Ireland, the 'Museum of Country Life'.

Gallery

See also
Turlock, California

References

Towns and villages in County Mayo